The 2009 season of the Cook Islands Round Cup was the thirty sixth recorded season of top flight association football competition in the Cook Islands, with any results between 1951 and 1969 and also in 1986 and 1988–1990 currently unknown. Nikao Sokattack won the championship, their sixth recorded championship. Tupapa Maraerenga were runners-up, with Arorangi finishing in third place.

League table
Nikao Sokattack won the league, which was played on a single round robin basis due to a late start in the season.

Results

References

Cook Islands Round Cup seasons
Cook
football